The Lyell Medal is a prestigious annual scientific medal given by the Geological Society of London, equal in status to the Murchison Medal. This medal is awarded based on one Earth Scientist's exceptional contribution of research to the scientific community.  It is named after Charles Lyell.

Lyell Medalists
Source: Geological Society

19th century 

 1876 John Morris
 1877 James Hector
 1878 George Busk
 1879 Edmond Hebert
 1880 John Evans
 1881 John William Dawson
 1882 John Lycett
 1883 William Benjamin Carpenter
 1884 Joseph Leidy
 1885 Harry Govier Seeley
 1886 William Pengelly
 1887 Samuel Allport
 1888 Henry Alleyne Nicholson
 1889 William Boyd Dawkins
 1890 Thomas Rupert Jones
 1891 Thomas McKenny Hughes
 1892 George Highfield Morton
 1893 Edwin Tulley Newton
 1894 John Milne
 1895 John Frederick Blake
 1896 Arthur Smith Woodward
 1897 George Jennings Hinde
 1898 Wilhelm Waagen
 1899 Charles Alexander McMahon
 1900 John Edward Marr

20th century

 1901 Ramsay Heatley Traquair
 1902 Antonin Fritsch
 1902 Richard Lydekker
 1903 Frederick William Rudler
 1904 Alfred Gabriel Nathorst
 1905 Hans Reusch
 1906 Frank Dawson Adams
 1907 (John) Joseph Frederick Whiteaves
 1908 Richard Dixon Oldham
 1909 Percy Fry Kendall
 1910 Arthur Vaughan
 1911 Francis Arthur Bather
 1911 Arthur Walton Rowe
 1912 Philip Lake
 1913 Sydney Savory Buckman
 1914 Charles Stewart Middlemiss
 1915 Edmund Johnston Garwood
 1916 Charles William Andrews
 1917 Wheelton Hind
 1918 Henry Woods
 1919 William Fraser Hume
 1920 Edward Greenly
 1921 Emmanuel de Margerie
 1922 Charles Davison
 1923 Gustave Frédéric Dollfus
 1924 William Wickham King
 1925 John Frederick Norman Green
 1926 Owen Thomas Jones
 1927 Albert Ernest Kitson
 1928 Sidney Hugh Reynolds
 1928 William Dickson Lang
 1929 Arthur Morley Davies
 1930 Frederick Chapman
 1930 Herbert Brantwood Maufe
 1931 Ernest Clayton Andrews
 1932 Henry Dewey
 1932 Maria Matilda Ogilvie Gordon
 1933 James Ernest Richey
 1934 Walter Howchin
 1934 Finlay Lorimer Kitchin
 1935 D. M. S. Watson
 1936 Eleanor Mary Reid
 1936 Leonard Johnston Wills
 1937 Linsdall Richardson
 1938 John Pringle
 1939 Noel Benson
 1940 Herbert Leader Hawkins
 1941 Ernest Sheppard Pinfold
 1942 William Sawney Bisat
 1943 Darashaw Nosherwan Wadia
 1944 Norman Ross Junner
 1945 Leonard Frank Spath
 1946 Robert Heron Rastall
 1947 Stanley Smith
 1948 Arthur Hubert Cox
 1949 William Joscelyn Arkell
 1950 Samuel James Shand
 1951 William Dixon West
 1952 Alfred Kingsley Wells
 1953 Oliver Meredith Boone Bulman
 1954 John Baird Simpson
 1955 Wilfred Norman Edwards
 1956 Leslie Reginald Cox
 1957 Stephen Henry Straw
 1958 Helen Marguerite Muir-Wood
 1959 David Williams
 1960 Doris Reynolds
 1961 John Vernon Harrison
 1962 Lawrence Wager
 1963 Neville George
 1964 Dorothy Hill
 1965 Charles Findlay Davidson
 1966 Sergei Ivanovich Tomkeieff
 1967 William Quarrier Kennedy
 1968 Maurice Black
 1969 Francis John Turner
 1970 Frederick Henry Stewart
 1971 Percival Allen
 1972 Alec Westley Skempton
 1973 Janet Vida Watson
 1974 Martin Fritz Glaessner
 1975 Dorothy Helen Rayner
 1976 Walter Brian Harland
 1977 Bernard Elgey Leake
 1978 Robin Gilbert Charles Bathurst
 1979 Derek Victor Ager
 1980 John Robert Lawrence Allen
 1981 William Stuart McKerrow
 1982 George P. L. Walker
 1983 John Frederick Dewey
 1984 Douglas James Sheannan
 1985 John Douglas Hudson
 1986 Harry Blackmore Whittington
 1987 Nicholas John Shackleton
 1988 Richard Gilbert West
 1989 John Michael "Jake" Hancock
 1990 Anthony Hallam
 1991 John Imbrie
 1992 Alfred G. Fischer
 1993 Michael Robert Leeder
 1994 William Gilbert Chaloner
 1995 Robert Keith O'Nions
 1996 Richard Allen Fortey
 1997 Richard Barrie Rickards
 1998 Simon Conway Morris
 1999 Ernest Henry Rutter
 2000 Derek Ernest Gilmor Briggs

21st century

 2001 Paul Tapponnier
 2002 Andrew Smith
 2003 Harry Elderfield
 2004 Dianne Edwards
 2005 Michael James Benton
 2006 Geoffrey Boulton
 2007 Phillip Allen
 2008 Alan Gilbert Smith
 2009 Nick McCave
 2010 William Ruddiman
 2011 Christopher Paola
 2012 Eric Wolff
 2013 Paula Reimer
 2014 Martin Brasier
 2015 Colin Ballantyne
 2016 John R. Underhill
 2017 Rosalind Rickaby
 2018 Julian A. Dowdeswell
 2019 Nicholas Kusznir
 2020 Rachel Wood

See also

 List of geology awards
 Prizes named after people

References

External links
 The Geological Society website list of winners

Geology awards
Awards of the Geological Society of London

British science and technology awards
Awards established in 1876
1876 establishments in England